Dmitri Anatolyevich Alenichev (born 20 October 1972) is a Russian football coach, former player and politician.

Club career
Despite being a Spartak Moscow fan, Alenichev debuted 1991 for Moscow rivals Lokomotiv Moscow, where he played four years before moving to Spartak, where in five years he won three Russian leagues and two cups, and was also elected Russian player of the year in 1997. Won Malta International Football Tournament 1996. He won a transfer to Italian Serie A side Roma, played 21 matches in the first season, but after only seven matches played in his second season, he moved to Perugia in December 1999. His stint in Italy overall proved to be unsuccessful and he was eventually considered to be one of Italian football's biggest foreign flops.

In 2000, he moved to Portuguese Primeira Liga side Porto, where he made a strong first impression, scored the equalizing goal against rivals Sporting CP in the first leg of the 2000 Supertaça Cândido de Oliveira. He was also impressive overall in first season, as Porto captured the Taça de Portugal after winning the final 2–0 against Marítimo, Alenichev scoring the second goal. The following season, Alenichev suffered some animosity from new Porto head coach Octávio Machado (similar to his compatriot Sergei Ovchinnikov) and spent most of the first half of the season sidelined, under the shadow of Deco. When Octávio was sacked and replaced with José Mourinho, Alenichev's prospects changed. Although he was not a regular in the starting 11, he was usually the first player substituted onto the pitch, particularly when Mourinho shifted from a 4–3–3 to a 4–4–2 formation. A starting player in the 2003 UEFA Cup Final and mid-match substitute in the 2004 UEFA Champions League Final, Alenichev scored in both contests, the only Russian player to do so as of 2023. In the former, against Celtic, he scored the second goal, following a pass from Deco; and in the latter, against Monaco, he closed the scoreline with a powerful volley shot following a deflected through cross from Derlei. This made him one of only three players to score goals in two consecutive cup finals of different European competitions, the others being Ronald Koeman and Ronaldo.

During UEFA Euro 2004, in which Alenichev played in all three of Russia's matchups, he announced his desire to return to Spartak Moscow. In appreciation for the services done for the club, the FC Porto board made no objections to the transfer.

On 8 April 2006, Sport-Express published Alenichev's interview containing severe criticism of Aleksandrs Starkovs, Spartak's head coach at the time. Following that, Alenichev was fined, dismissed from the first team, transfer listed 14 April and on 10 September his contract was finally terminated by mutual agreement. This marked the end of his playing career.

Managerial career
In 2011, he joined FC Arsenal Tula as a manager and led the club through three promotions in 3 seasons from fourth-level Russian Amateur Football League to the top-level Russian Premier League. Arsenal was relegated after just one season in the top tier and Alenichev left.

In June 2015, he became manager of his former club Spartak Moscow. He resigned as Spartak manager on 5 August 2016 following Spartak's elimination in the 2016–17 UEFA Europa League third qualifying round by AEK Larnaca. At the end of that season, Spartak won the Russian Premier League for the first time in 16 years under the management of his assistant Massimo Carrera.

On 5 June 2017, Alenichev signed a two-year contract with Russian second division club Yenisey Krasnoyarsk. In his first season, he led Yenisey to promotion to the Russian Premier League for the first time in club's history. He was replaced as Yenisey coach after the club was relegated from the Premier League at the end of the 2018–19 season.

Style of play
A technically gifted and offensive-minded midfielder, Alenichev's favoured role was as a number 10 behind the strikers; he was also deployed as a central midfielder on occasion throughout his career, although he lacked both the physicality and tactical sense to excel in this position.

Personal life
His older brother Andrei Alenichev also played football professionally. He has two sons, Maksim (born 2001) and Daniil (born 2004) who followed on his footsteps and became footballers too.

Alenichev joined the United Russia party. On 14 June 2007, he was voted the representative of the Omsk Oblast in the Federation Council of Russia. He represented it until 2010, when he accepted the position of head coach of the Russia national under-18 team.

In 2009, Alenichev was part of the Russia squad that won the 2009 Legends Cup.

Career statistics

Club

International

International goals

Managerial
Information correct as of match played 26 May 2019. Only competitive matches are counted.

Notes:

Honours

Spartak Moscow
Russian Premier League: 1994, 1996, 1997, 1998
Russian Cup: 1993–94, 1997–98
Commonwealth of Independent States Cup: 1994, 1995

Porto
Primeira Liga: 2002–03, 2003–04
Taça de Portugal: 2000–01, 2002–03
Supertaça Cândido de Oliveira: 2003
UEFA Champions League: 2003–04
UEFA Cup: 2002–03

Individual
Footballer of the Year in Russia (Sport-Express): 1997
Footballer of the Year in Russia (Futbol): 1997

References

External links

 Dmitri Alenichev celebrates goal with Porto

1972 births
Living people
People from Velikoluksky District
Soviet footballers
Soviet Union under-21 international footballers
Russian footballers
Russia under-21 international footballers
Russia international footballers
A.S. Roma players
A.C. Perugia Calcio players
Serie A players
Expatriate footballers in Portugal
Expatriate footballers in Italy
FC Porto players
Members of the Federation Council of Russia (after 2000)
FC Spartak Moscow players
2002 FIFA World Cup players
UEFA Euro 2004 players
Association football midfielders
Russian expatriate footballers
Russian expatriate sportspeople in Portugal
Russian Premier League players
Primeira Liga players
Russian football managers
FC Lokomotiv Moscow players
FC Arsenal Tula managers
Russian Premier League managers
FC Spartak Moscow managers
UEFA Champions League winning players
UEFA Cup winning players
FC Yenisey Krasnoyarsk managers
Sportspeople from Pskov Oblast